"Kind of Like It's Love" is a song recorded by Canadian country music artist Jason McCoy. It was released in 2000 as the first single from his fourth studio album, Honky Tonk Sonatas. It peaked at number 3 on the RPM Country Tracks chart in September 2000.

Chart performance

References

2000 songs
2000 singles
Jason McCoy songs
Universal Music Group singles
Songs written by Jim Lauderdale
Songs written by John Leventhal